The Freie Akademie der Künste in Hamburg e.V. is a not-for-profit association of artists, founded in 1950 by the organ-builder and writer Hans Henny Jahnn. It now includes architecture, visual arts, performing arts, literature, media and music sections.

References

External links

Culture in Hamburg
Art and design organizations
Organisations based in Hamburg
Organizations established in 1950
Academies of arts